Human subject may refer to:
 Subject (philosophy)
 Human subject research